The Banu Ashqilula were the governors or arraeces of Málaga and Guadix. Their assistance to Muhammad ibn al-Ahmar in founding the Emirate of Granada and their later opposition to al-Ahmar's successors made the Asqilula one of the most influential families of the 13th century Spain. The Ashqilula were one of the clans who were able to maneuver themselves into positions of prominence and influence under the rule of the Nasrid Dynasty. The family first rose to prominence in 1232 when their leader Abu'l Hasan Ali Ibn Ashqilula al-Tujibi helped the Nasrid dynasty during the conquest of Granada. For the first twenty years of Nasrid rule in Granada, the Ashqilula worked closely with al-Ahmar in his early endeavors, like the short lived conquest of Seville. As reward for their service, the Asqilula were granted governorships in the Nasrid territories of Málaga, Guadix and Baza.

Notes

Bibliography

13th century in Al-Andalus
Emirate of Granada